Ludovic is a given name and has also been a surname.

People with the given name

A
 Ludovic Albós Cavaliere (born 1979), Andorran ski mountaineer
 Ludovic Ambruș (born 1946), Romanian wrestler who competed in the 1972 Summer Olympics
 Ludovic Arrachart (1897–1933), French aviator
 Ludovic Assemoassa (born 1980), French-born Togolese football defender
 Ludovic Asuar (born 1976), French footballer
 Ludovic Auger (born 1971), French road bicycle racer
 Ludovic Augustin (born 1902), Haitian Olympic sport shooter

B
 Ludovic Baal (born 1986), French Guianese football left back
 Ludovic Batelli (born 1963), French football goalkeeper
 Ludovic Blas (born 1997), French football midfielder
 Ludovic Boi (born 1989), Mauritian-Australian footballer
 Ludovic Booz (1940–2015), Haitian painter and sculptor
 Ludovic Bource (born 1970), French composer
 Ludovic Boulesteix (fl. 1990s), French slalom canoer
 Ludovic Bruckstein (1920–1988), Romanian writer
 Ludovic Bruni (born 1976), French guitarist, bassist and music producer
 Ludovic Butelle (born 1983), French footballer
 Ludovic Buysens (born 1986), Belgian footballer

C
 Ludovic Capelle (born 1976), Belgian road racing cyclist
 Ludovic Chammartin (born 1985), Swiss judoka
 Ludovic Chelle (born 1983), Malian-French basketball player
 Ludovic Clément (born 1976), Martiniquais footballer
 Ludovic Clemente (born 1986), Andorran footballer
 Ludovic Colquhoun (1804–1882), Texas Senator and merchant of San Antonio, Texas

D
 Ludovic Dauș (1873–1953), Romanian prose writer, playwright, poet and translator
 Ludovic Debeurme, French comic artist
 Ludovic Delporte (born 1980), French football midfielder
 Ludovic Depickère (born 1969), French magician and freestyle swimmer

F
 Ludovic Fabregas (born 1996), French handball player
 Ludovic Franck (born 1907), Belgian sailor

G
 Ludovic G. (1835–1886), pen name of Jean Louis Gobbaerts, Belgian pianist and composer
 Ludovic Gamboa (born 1986), French football midfielder
 Ludovic Gapenne, Paralympian athlete from France
 Ludovic Garreau (born 1983), French ice hockey player
 Ludovic Genest (born 1987), French footballer
 Ludovic Giuly (born 1976), French football winger
 Ludovic Golliard (born 1983), French footballer
 Ludovic Gotin (born 1985), Guadeloupean footballer
 Ludovic Graugnard (born 1977), French football manager
 Ludovic Guerriero (born 1985), French football defensive midfielder

H
 Ludovic Halévy (1834–1908), French author and playwright
 Ludovic Henry (born 1968), French Olympic dressage rider
 Ludovic Heraud (born 1913), French sports shooter
 Ludovic Hubler, French traveller

J
 Ludovic Janvier (1934–2016), French novelist, poet, essayist, and short stories writer
 Ludovic Jean-Luc Butelle (born 1983), French footballer

K
 Ludovic Kashindi (born 1984), Canadian football defensive back
 Ludovic Kennedy (1919–2009), British journalist, broadcaster, humanist and author

L
 Ludovic Lalanne (1815–1898), French historian and librarian
 Ludovic Lamothe (1882–1953), Haitian composer and virtuoso pianist
 Ludovic Lebart, French statistician
 Ludovic Leroy (born 1975), French footballer
 Ludovic Lewis, Welsh politician who sat in the House of Commons from 1647 to 1653
 Ludovic Lindsay, 16th Earl of Crawford (1600–1652), Scot who took part in the plot of 1641 called The Incident
 Ludovic Lidon (born 1971), French football defender
 Ludovic Liron (born 1978), French football defender
Ludovic Loquet (born 1965), French politician
 Ludovic Loustau (born 1973), French rugby union footballer

M
 Ludovic Magnin (born 1979), Swiss football manager and defender
 Ludovic Martin (born 1976), French cyclist
 Ludovic Mary (born 1977), French footballer
 Ludovic Mercier (born 1976), French rugby union player
 Ludovic Millet (born 1985), French kickboxer
 Ludovic Morlot (born 1973), French conductor
 Ludovic Mrazek (1867–1944), Romanian geologist

O
 Ludovic Obraniak (born 1984), French-born Polish footballer
 Ludovic O'Followell, French doctor and author
 Ludovic Orban (born 1963), Romanian engineer and politician

P
 Ludovic Pancrate (born 1987), French footballer
 Ludovic Paratte (born 1992), Swiss footballer
 Ludovic Piette (1826–1878), French Impressionist painter
 Ludovic Pollet (born 1970), French footballer
 Ludovic Charles Porter (1869–1928), British administrator in India
 Ludovic Proto (born 1965), French boxer who competed at the 1988 Summer Olympics

Q
 Ludovic Quistin (1984–2012), Guadeloupean football defender

R
 Ludovic Radosavljevic (born 1989), French rugby union player
 Ludovic Routhier (born 1931), Canadian politician from Quebec
 Ludovic Roux (born 1979), French Nordic combined skier
 Ludovic Roy (born 1977), French football goalkeeper

S
 Ludovic Saline (born 1989), French footballer
 Ludovic Savatier (1830–1891), French botanist
 Ludovic Soares (born 1994), French footballer
 Ludovic Stewart, 2nd Duke of Lennox (1574–1624), Scottish nobleman and politician
 Ludovic Stuart, Scottish rugby union player
 Ludovic Sylvestre (born 1984), French football midfielder

T
 Ludovic Trarieux (1840–1904), French Republican statesman
 Ludovic Turpin (born 1975), French road racing cyclist

V
 Ludovic Valbon (born 1976), French rugby union footballer
 Ludovic Valborge (born 1889), Olympic sport shooter from Haiti
 Ludovic Viltard (born 1983), French footballer
 Ludovic Vitet (1802–1873), French dramatist and politician

Z
 Ludovic Zanoni (born 1935), Romanian cyclist

Fictional characters with the given name
 Ludovic Bagman, in J.K. Rowling's book Harry Potter and the Goblet of Fire

People with the surname
 Alexandre Ludovic (born 1990), Portuguese professional footballer

See also
 Ludo (given name)
 Ludovica
 Ludvig
 Louis (given name)

French masculine given names